Lee Kee-keun (born on August 13, 1965) is a former South Korea football player. He was member of South Korea U-20 at the 1983 FIFA World Youth Championship and he was top scorer of K-League twice. He is currently manager of Hoengseong FC.

Honors and awards

Player
POSCO Atoms
 K-League Winners (2) : 1988, 1992

Individual
 K-League Regular Season Top Scorer Award (2): 1988, 1991
 K-League Cup Top Assistor Award (1): 1992
 K-League Best XI (2) : 1988, 1991

External links
 
 FIFA Player Statistics

1965 births
Living people
Association football forwards
South Korean footballers
South Korea international footballers
Pohang Steelers players
Busan IPark players
Suwon Samsung Bluewings players
Hanyang University alumni